Sandy Báez (born November 25, 1993) is a Dominican professional baseball pitcher for the Long Island Ducks of the Atlantic League of Professional Baseball. He previously played in Major League Baseball (MLB) for the Detroit Tigers.

Career

Detroit Tigers
Báez signed with the Detroit Tigers as an international free agent in October 2011. He made his professional debut in 2012 for the DSL Tigers and spent the whole season there, going 0–3 with a 5.21 ERA in ten games (nine starts). He returned there in 2013, compiling an 8–1 record and 2.05 ERA in 14 games (ten starts). In 2014, he pitched for the GCL Tigers where he was 1–2 with a 3.06 ERA and 1.26 WHIP in 12 starts, and in 2015, he played with the Connecticut Tigers where he pitched to a 3–4 record and 4.13 ERA in 14 games started. He spent 2016 with the West Michigan Whitecaps where he was 7–9 with a 3.81 ERA in 21 starts.

The Tigers added him to their 40-man roster after the 2016 season. He spent 2017 with both the Lakeland Flying Tigers and the Erie SeaWolves, compiling a combined 6–8 record and 3.92 ERA in 19 starts between the two teams. The Tigers called up Baez as the 26th man for the doubleheader against the New York Yankees on June 4, 2018. He pitched 4 scoreless innings with three walks and four strikeouts in the first game of the doubleheader and was sent back down to Erie after the second game. He was recalled by the Tigers on September 1, as a September call-up. He played for the Mesa Solar Sox of the Arizona Fall League after the 2018 regular season. In 2019, he was optioned to the Toledo Mud Hens to open the season. On August 9, 2019, Baez was released by the Tigers. Baez re-signed with the Tigers on a minor league deal on August 13. He became a free agent on November 2, 2020.

Long Island Ducks
On March 29, 2022, Báez signed with the Long Island Ducks of the Atlantic League of Professional Baseball for the 2022 season.

References

External links

1993 births
Living people
Connecticut Tigers players
Detroit Tigers players
Dominican Republic expatriate baseball players in the United States
Dominican Summer League Tigers players
Erie SeaWolves players
Estrellas Orientales players
Gulf Coast Tigers players
Lakeland Flying Tigers players
Long Island Ducks players
Major League Baseball pitchers
Major League Baseball players from the Dominican Republic
Mesa Solar Sox players
Tiburones de La Guaira players
Toledo Mud Hens players
West Michigan Whitecaps players
Dominican Republic expatriate baseball players in Venezuela